"Flawless" is a song by American electronica trio the Ones. The song samples Gary's Gang's 1978 song "Keep On Dancin'" and "Wordy Rappinghood" by Tom Tom Club. "Flawless" peaked at number seven on the UK Singles Chart. According to the Australian Recording Industry Association, the song was the most popular club hit in Australia during 2001.

In 2003, British singer George Michael sampled "Flawless" for his song "Flawless (Go to the City)", which was released in June 2004. The song peaked at number eight on the UK Singles Chart, one position lower than the original's peak.

Track listings

US CD single
 "Flawless" (radio edit)
 "Flawless" (Phunk Investigation vox)
 "Flawless" (Different Gear remix)
 "Flawless" (Sono's Tuxedo main mix)
 "Flawless" (original mix)

UK CD and cassette single, Australasian CD single
 "Flawless" (radio edit) – 3:08
 "Flawless" (Phunk Investigation vocal mix) – 7:39
 "Flawless" (Sharp Hammerhead remix) – 8:09

UK 12-inch single
A1. "Flawless" (Phunk Investigation vocal mix) – 7:39
AA1. "Flawless" (Sharp Hammerhead remix) – 5:45
AA2. "Flawless" (Different Gear remix) – 6:23

European CD single
 "Flawless" (radio edit)
 "Flawless" (Phunk Investigation vocal mix)

Charts

Weekly charts

Year-end charts

Release history

See also
 "Flawless (Go to the City)"
 List of UK Dance Singles Chart number ones of 2001

References

External links
 Lyrics at Genius

2001 debut singles
2001 songs
Positiva Records singles